Pectineal line may refer to:

Pectineal line (femur)
Pectineal line (pubis)
Pectinate line, border between anal canal and rectum